Kevin Lubbers is an American former professional tennis player.

Lubbers, a Maryland native, attended Bethesda-Chevy Chase High School and was the 1981 MPSSAA singles champion. In 1986 he partnered with Mark Ozer to win a national amateur doubles title at the USTA Indoor Championships. On the professional tour he was most successful in doubles, with a best world ranking of 255. He was a doubles quarter-finalist at the 1990 Estoril Open and featured in doubles qualifying draws at Wimbledon.

ATP Challenger finals

Doubles: 1 (0–1)

References

External links
 
 

Year of birth missing (living people)
Living people
American male tennis players
Tennis people from Maryland
People from Bethesda, Maryland